The Gauls (Galátai) were a group of Celtic peoples of mainland Europe in the Iron Age and the Roman period (roughly 5th century BC to 5th century AD). Their homeland was known as Gaul (Gallia). They spoke Gaulish, a continental Celtic language.

The Gauls emerged around the 5th century BC as bearers of La Tène culture north and west of the Alps. By the 4th century BC, they were spread over much of what is now France, Belgium, Switzerland, Southern Germany, Austria, and the Czech Republic, by virtue of controlling the trade routes along the river systems of the Rhône, Seine, Rhine, and Danube. They reached the peak of their power in the 3rd century BC. During the 4th and 3rd centuries BC, the Gauls expanded into Northern Italy (Cisalpine Gaul), leading to the Roman–Gallic wars, and into the Balkans, leading to war with the Greeks. These latter Gauls eventually settled in Anatolia, becoming known as Galatians. 

After the end of the First Punic War, the rising Roman Republic increasingly put pressure on the Gallic sphere of influence. The Battle of Telamon (225 BC) heralded a gradual decline of Gallic power during the 2nd century BC. The Romans eventually conquered Gaul in the Gallic Wars (58–50 BC), making it a Roman province, which brought about the hybrid Gallo-Roman culture.

The Gauls were made up of many tribes (toutās), many of whom built large fortified settlements called oppida (such as Bibracte), and minted their own coins. Gaul was never united under a single ruler or government, but the Gallic tribes were capable of uniting their armies in large-scale military operations, such as those led by Brennus and Vercingetorix. They followed an ancient Celtic religion overseen by druids. The Gauls also produced the Coligny calendar.

Name
The ethnonym Galli is generally derived from a Celtic root *gal- 'power, ability' (cf. Old Breton gal 'power, ability', Irish gal 'bravery, courage'). Brittonic reflexes give evidence of an n-stem *gal-n-, with the regular development *galn- > gall- (cf. Middle Welsh gallu, Middle Breton gallout 'to be able', Cornish gallos 'power'). The ethnic names Galátai and Gallitae, as well as Gaulish personal names such as Gallus or Gallius, are also related. The modern French gaillard ('brave, vigorous, healthy') stems from the Gallo-Latin noun *galia- or *gallia- ('power, strength'). Linguist Václav Blažek has argued that Irish gall ('foreigner') and Welsh gâl ('enemy, hostile') may be later adaptations of the ethnic name Galli that were introduced to the British Isles during the 1st millennium AD.

According to Caesar (mid-1st c. BC), the Gauls of the province of Gallia Celtica called themselves Celtae in their own language, and were called Galli in Latin. Romans indeed used the ethnic name Galli as synonym to Celtae.

The English Gaul does not come from Latin Galli but from Germanic *Walhaz, a term stemming from the Gallic ethnonym Volcae that came to designate more generally Celtic and Romance speakers in medieval Germanic languages (e.g. Welsh, Waals, Vlachs).

History

Origins and early history

Gaulish culture developed over the first millennium BC. The Urnfield culture (c. 1300–750 BC) represents the Celts as a distinct cultural branch of the Indo-European-speaking people. The spread of iron working led to the Hallstatt culture in the 8th century BC; the Proto-Celtic language is often thought to have been spoken around this time. The Hallstatt culture evolved into La Tène culture in around the 5th century BC. The Greek and Etruscan civilizations and colonies began to influence the Gauls, especially in the Mediterranean area. Gauls under Brennus invaded Rome circa 390 BC.

By the 5th century BC, the tribes later called Gauls had migrated from Central France to the Mediterranean coast. Gallic invaders settled the Po Valley in the 4th century BC, defeated Roman forces in a battle under Brennus in 390 BC, and raided Italy as far south as Sicily.

In the early 3rd century BC, the Gauls attempted an eastward expansion, toward the Balkan peninsula. At that time it was a Greek province, and the Gauls' intent was to reach and loot the rich Greek city-states of the Greek mainland. But the Greeks exterminated the majority of the Gallic army, and the few survivors were forced to flee.

Many Gauls were recorded as serving in the armies of Carthage during the Punic Wars. One of the leading rebel leaders of the Mercenary War, Autaritus, was of Gallic origin.

Balkan wars

During the Balkan expedition, led by Cerethrios, Brennos and Bolgios, the Gauls raided the Greek mainland twice.

At the end of the second expedition the Gallic raiders had been repelled by the coalition armies of the various Greek city-states and were forced to retreat to Illyria and Thrace, but the Greeks were forced to grant safe passage to the Gauls who then made their way to Asia Minor and settled in Central Anatolia. The Gallic area of settlement in Asia Minor was called Galatia; there they created widespread havoc. They were checked through the use of war elephants and skirmishers by the Greek Seleucid king Antiochus I in 275 BC, after which they served as mercenaries across the whole Hellenistic Eastern Mediterranean, including Ptolemaic Egypt, where they, under Ptolemy II Philadelphus (285-246 BC), attempted to seize control of the kingdom.

In the first Gallic invasion of Greece (279 BC), they defeated the Macedonians and killed the Macedonian king Ptolemy Keraunos. They then focused on looting the rich Macedonian countryside, but avoided the heavily fortified cities. The Macedonian general Sosthenes assembled an army, defeated Bolgius and repelled the invading Gauls.

In the second Gaulish invasion of Greece (278 BC), the Gauls, led by Brennos, suffered heavy losses while facing the Greek coalition army at Thermopylae, but helped by the Heracleans they followed the mountain path around Thermopylae to encircle the Greek army in the same way that the Persian army had done at the Battle of Thermopylae in 480 BC, but this time defeating the whole of the Greek army. After passing Thermopylae the Gauls headed for the rich treasury at Delphi, where they were defeated by the re-assembled Greek army. This led to a series of retreats of the Gauls, with devastating losses, all the way up to Macedonia and then out of the Greek mainland. The major part of the Gaul army was defeated in the process, and those Gauls survived were forced to flee from Greece. The Gallic leader Brennos was seriously injured at Delphi and committed suicide there. (He is not to be confused with another Gaulish leader bearing the same name who had sacked Rome a century earlier (390 BC).

Galatian war

In 278 BC Gaulish settlers in the Balkans were invited by Nicomedes I of Bithynia to help him in a dynastic struggle against his brother. They numbered about 10,000 fighting men and about the same number of women and children, divided into three tribes, Trocmi, Tolistobogii and Tectosages. They were eventually defeated by the Seleucid king Antiochus I (275 BC), in a battle in which the Seleucid war elephants shocked the Galatians. Although the momentum of the invasion was broken, the Galatians were by no means exterminated, and continued to demand tribute from the Hellenistic states of Anatolia to avoid war. 4,000 Galatians were hired as mercenaries by the Ptolemaic Egyptian king Ptolemy II Philadelphus in 270 BC. According to Pausanias, soon after arrival the Celts plotted “to seize Egypt”, and so Ptolemy marooned them on a deserted island in the Nile River.

Galatians also participated at the victory at Raphia in 217 BC under Ptolemy IV Philopator, and continued to serve as mercenaries for the Ptolemaic dynasty until its demise in 30 BC. They sided with the renegade Seleucid prince Antiochus Hierax, who reigned in Asia Minor. Hierax tried to defeat king Attalus I of Pergamum (241–197 BC), but instead, the Hellenized cities united under Attalus's banner, and his armies inflicted a severe defeat upon the Galatians at the Battle of the Caecus River in 241 BC. After this defeat, the Galatians continued to be a serious threat to the states of Asia Minor. In fact, they continued to be a threat even after their defeat by Gnaeus Manlius Vulso in the Galatian War (189 BC). Galatia declined and at times fell under Pontic ascendancy. They were finally freed by the Mithridatic Wars, in which they supported Rome. In the settlement of 64 BC, Galatia became a client state of the Roman empire, the old constitution disappeared, and three chiefs (wrongly styled "tetrarchs") were appointed, one for each tribe. But this arrangement soon gave way before the ambition of one of these tetrarchs, Deiotarus, a contemporary of Cicero and Julius Caesar, who made himself master of the other two tetrarchies and was finally recognized by the Romans as 'king' of Galatia. The Galatian language continued to be spoken in central Anatolia until the 6th century.

Roman wars

In the Second Punic War the famous Carthaginian general Hannibal used Gallic mercenaries in his invasion of Italy. They played a part in some of his most spectacular victories, including the battle of Cannae. The Gauls were so prosperous by the 2nd century that the powerful Greek colony of Massilia had to appeal to the Roman Republic for defense against them. The Romans intervened in southern Gaul in 125 BC, and conquered the area eventually known as Gallia Narbonensis by 121 BC.

In 58 BC Julius Caesar launched the Gallic Wars and had conquered the whole of Gaul by 51 BC. He noted that the Gauls (Celtae) were one of the three primary peoples in the area, along with the Aquitanians and the Belgae. Caesar's motivation for the invasion seems to have been his need for gold to pay off his debts and for a successful military expedition to boost his political career. The people of Gaul could provide him with both. So much gold was looted from Gaul that after the war the price of gold fell by as much as 20%. While they were militarily just as brave as the Romans, the internal division between the Gallic tribes guaranteed an easy victory for Caesar, and Vercingetorix's attempt to unite the Gauls against Roman invasion came too late. After the annexation of Gaul a mixed Gallo-Roman culture began to emerge.

Roman Gaul

After more than a century of warfare, the Cisalpine Gauls were subdued by the Romans in the early 2nd century BC. The Transalpine Gauls continued to thrive for another century, and joined the Germanic Cimbri and Teutones in the Cimbrian War, where they defeated and killed a Roman consul at Burdigala in 107 BC, and later became prominent among the rebelling gladiators in the Third Servile War. The Gauls were finally conquered by Julius Caesar in the 50s BC despite a rebellion by the Arvernian chieftain Vercingetorix. During the Roman period the Gauls became assimilated into Gallo-Roman culture and by expanding Germanic tribes. During the crisis of the third century, there was briefly a breakaway Gallic Empire founded by the Batavian general Postumus.

Physical appearance

4th-century Roman historian Ammianus Marcellinus wrote that the Gauls were tall, light-skinned, light-haired, and light-eyed:
Almost all Gauls are tall and fair-skinned, with reddish hair. Their savage eyes make them fearful objects; they are eager to quarrel and excessively truculent.
When, in the course of a dispute, any of them calls in his wife, a creature with gleaming eyes much stronger than her husband, they are more than a match for a whole group of foreigners; especially when the woman, with swollen neck and gnashing teeth, swings her great white arms and begins to deliver a rain of punches mixed with kicks, like missiles launched by the twisted strings of a catapult.
1st-century BC Greek historian Diodorus Siculus described them as tall, generally heavily built, very light-skinned, and light-haired, with long hair and mustaches:
The Gauls are tall of body, with rippling muscles, and white of skin, and their hair is blond, and not only naturally so, but they make it their practice to increase the distinguishing color by which nature has given it. For they are always washing their hair in limewater, and they pull it back from their forehead to the top of the head and back to the nape of the neck... Some of them shave their beards, but others let it grow a little; and the nobles shave their cheeks, but they let the mustache grow until it covers the mouth.

Jordanes, in his Origins and Deeds of the Goths, indirectly describes the Gauls as light-haired and large-bodied by comparing them to Caledonians, as a contrast to the Spaniards, who he compared to the Silures. He speculates based on this comparison that the Britons originated from different peoples, including said Gauls and Spaniards.
The Silures have swarthy features and are usually born with curly black hair, but the inhabitants of Caledonia have reddish hair and large loose-jointed bodies. They [the Britons] are like the Gauls and the Spaniards, according as they are opposite either nation. Hence some have supposed that from these lands the island received its inhabitants.

In the novel Satyricon by Roman courtier Gaius Petronius, a Roman character sarcastically suggests that he and his partner "chalk our faces so that Gaul may claim us as her own" in the midst of a rant outlining the problems with his partner's plan of using blackface to impersonate Aethiopians. This suggests that Gauls were thought of on average to be much paler than Romans.

Culture
All over Gaul, archeology has uncovered many pre-Roman gold mines (at least 200 in the Pyrenees), suggesting they were very rich, also evidenced by large finds of gold coins and artefacts. Also there existed highly developed population centers, called oppida by Caesar, such as Bibracte, Gergovia, Avaricum, Alesia, Bibrax, Manching and others. Modern archeology strongly suggests that the countries of Gaul were quite civilized and very wealthy. Most had contact with Roman merchants and some, particularly those that were governed by Republics such as the Aedui, Helvetii and others, had enjoyed stable political alliances with Rome. They imported Mediterranean wine on an industrial scale, evidenced by large finds of wine vessels in digs all over Gaul, the largest and most famous of which being the one discovered in Vix Grave, which stands 1.63 m (5′ 4″) high.

Art
Gallic art corresponds to two archaeological material cultures: the Hallstatt culture (c. 1200–450 BC) and the La Tène culture (c. 450–1 BC). Each of these eras has a characteristic style, and while there is much overlap between them, the two styles recognizably differ. From the late Hallstatt onwards and certainly through the entirety of La Tène, Gaulish art is reckoned to be the beginning of what is called Celtic art today. After the end of the La Tène and from the beginning of Roman rule, Gaulish art evolved into Gallo-Roman art.

Hallstatt decoration is mostly geometric and linear, and is best seen on fine metalwork finds from graves. Animals, with waterfowl a particular favorite, are often included as part of ornamentation, more often than humans. Commonly found objects include weapons, in latter periods often with hilts terminating in curving forks ("antenna hilts"), and jewelry, which include fibulae, often with a row of disks hanging down on chains, armlets, and some torcs. Though these are most often found in bronze, some examples, likely belonging to chieftains or other preeminent figures, are made of gold. Decorated situlae and bronze belt plates show influence from Greek and Etruscan figurative traditions. Many of these characteristics were continued into the succeeding La Tène style.

La Tène metalwork in bronze, iron and gold, developing technologically out of the Hallstatt culture, is stylistically characterized by "classical vegetable and foliage motifs such as leafy palmette forms, vines, tendrils and lotus flowers together with spirals, S-scrolls, lyre and trumpet shapes". Such decoration may be found on fine bronze vessels, helmets and shields, horse trappings, and elite jewelry, especially torcs and fibulae. Early on, La Tène style adapted ornamental motifs from foreign cultures into something distinctly new; the complicated brew of influences include Scythian art as well as that of the Greeks and Etruscans, among others. The Achaemenid occupation of Thrace and Macedonia around 500 BC is a factor of uncertain importance.

Social structure
Gaulish society was dominated by the druid priestly class. The druids were not the only political force, however, and the early political system was complex. The fundamental unit of Gallic politics was the tribe, which itself consisted of one or more of what Caesar called "pagi". Each tribe had a council of elders, and initially a king. Later, the executive was an annually-elected magistrate. Among the Aedui tribe the executive held the title of "Vergobret", a position much like a king, but its powers were held in check by rules laid down by the council.

The tribal groups, or pagi as the Romans called them (singular: pagus; the French word pays, "country", comes from this term) were organized into larger super-tribal groups that the Romans called civitates. These administrative groupings would be taken over by the Romans in their system of local control, and these civitates would also be the basis of France's eventual division into ecclesiastical bishoprics and dioceses, which would remain in place—with slight changes—until the French Revolution imposed the modern departmental system.

Though the tribes were moderately stable political entities, Gaul as a whole tended to be politically divided, there being virtually no unity among the various tribes. Only during particularly trying times, such as the invasion of Caesar, could the Gauls unite under a single leader like Vercingetorix. Even then, however, the faction lines were clear.

The Romans divided Gaul broadly into Provincia (the conquered area around the Mediterranean), and the northern Gallia Comata ("free Gaul" or "wooded Gaul"). Caesar divided the people of Gaulia Comata into three broad groups: the Aquitani; Galli (who in their own language were called Celtae); and Belgae. In the modern sense, Gallic tribes are defined linguistically, as speakers of Gaulish. While the Aquitani were probably Vascons, the Belgae would thus probably be counted among the Gauls tribes, perhaps with Germanic elements.

Julius Caesar, in his book, Commentarii de Bello Gallico, comments:

Language

Gaulish or Gallic is the name given to the Celtic language spoken in Gaul before Latin took over. According to Caesar's Commentaries on the Gallic War, it was one of three languages in Gaul, the others being Aquitanian and Belgic. In Gallia Transalpina, a Roman province by the time of Caesar, Latin was the language spoken since at least the previous century. Gaulish is paraphyletically grouped with Celtiberian, Lepontic, and Galatian as Continental Celtic. Lepontic and Galatian are sometimes considered dialects of Gaulish.

The exact time of the final extinction of Gaulish is unknown, but it is estimated to be around or shortly after the middle of the 1st millennium. Gaulish may have survived in some regions as the mid to late 6th century in France. Despite considerable Romanization of the local material culture, the Gaulish language is held to have survived and had coexisted with spoken Latin during the centuries of Roman rule of Gaul. Coexisting with Latin, Gaulish played a role in shaping the Vulgar Latin dialects that developed into French, with effects including loanwords and calques, sound changes shaped by Gaulish influence, as well as in conjugation and word order. Recent work in computational simulation suggests that Gaulish played a role in gender shifts of words in Early French, whereby the gender would shift to match the gender of the corresponding Gaulish word with the same meaning.

Religion

Like other Celtic peoples, the Gauls had a polytheistic religion. Evidence about their religion is gleaned from archaeology and Greco-Roman accounts.

Some deities were venerated only in one region, but others were more widely known. The Gauls seem to have had a father god, who was often a god of the tribe and of the dead (Toutatis probably being one name for him); and a mother goddess who was associated with the land, earth and fertility (Matrona probably being one name for her). The mother goddess could also take the form of a war goddess as protectress of her tribe and its land. There also seems to have been a male celestial god—identified with Taranis—associated with thunder, the wheel, and the bull. There were gods of skill and craft, such as the pan-regional god Lugus, and the smith god Gobannos. Gallic healing deities were often associated with sacred springs, such as Sirona and Borvo. Other pan-regional deities include the horned god Cernunnos, the horse and fertility goddess Epona, Ogmios, Sucellos and his companion Nantosuelta. Caesar says the Gauls believed they all descended from a god of the dead and underworld, whom he likened to Dīs Pater. Some deities were seen as threefold, like the Three Mothers. According to Miranda Aldhouse-Green, the Celts were also animists, believing that every part of the natural world had a spirit.

Greco-Roman writers say the Gauls believed in reincarnation. Diodorus says they believed souls were reincarnated after a certain number of years, probably after spending time in an afterlife, and noted they buried grave goods with the dead.

Gallic religious ceremonies were overseen by priests known as druids, who also served as judges, teachers, and lore-keepers. There is evidence that the Gauls sacrificed animals, almost always livestock. An example is the sanctuary at Gournay-sur-Aronde. It appears some were offered wholly to the gods (by burying or burning), while some were shared between gods and humans (part eaten and part offered). There is also some evidence that the Gauls sacrificed humans, and some Greco-Roman sources claim the Gauls sacrificed criminals by burning them in a wicker man. 

The Romans said the Gauls held ceremonies in sacred groves and other natural shrines, called nemetons. Celtic peoples often made votive offerings: treasured items deposited in water and wetlands, or in ritual shafts and wells, often in the same place over generations.

Among the Romans and Greeks, the Gauls had a reputation as head hunters. There is archaeological evidence of a "head cult" among the Gallic Salyes, who embalmed and displayed severed heads, for example at Entremont. 

The Roman conquest gave rise to a syncretic Gallo-Roman religion, with deities such as Lenus Mars, Apollo Grannus, and the pairing of Rosmerta with Mercury.

List of Gaulish tribes

The Gauls were made up of many tribes who controlled a particular territory and often built large fortified settlements called oppida. After completing the conquest of Gaul, the Roman Empire made most of these tribes civitates. The geographical subdivisions of the early church in Gaul were then based on these, and continued as French dioceses until the French Revolution.

The following is a list of recorded Gaulish tribes, in both Latin and the reconstructed Gaulish language (*), as well as their capitals during the Roman period.

Modern reception

The Gauls played a certain role in the national historiography and national identity of modern France. Attention given to the Gauls as the founding population of the French nation was traditionally second to that enjoyed by the Franks, out of whose kingdom the historical kingdom of France arose under the Capetian dynasty; for example, Charles de Gaulle is on record as stating, "For me, the history of France begins with Clovis, elected as king of France by the tribe of the Franks, who gave their name to France. Before Clovis, we have Gallo-Roman and Gaulish prehistory. The decisive element, for me, is that Clovis was the first king to have been baptized a Christian. My country is a Christian country and I reckon the history of France beginning with the accession of a Christian king who bore the name of the Franks."

However, the dismissal of "Gaulish prehistory" as irrelevant for French national identity has been far from universal. Pre-Roman Gaul has been evoked as a template for French independence especially during the Third French Republic (1870–1940). An iconic phrase summarizing this view is that of "our ancestors the Gauls" (nos ancêtres les Gaulois), associated with the history textbook for schools by Ernest Lavisse (1842–1922), who taught that "the Romans established themselves in small numbers; the Franks were not numerous either, Clovis having but a few thousand men with him. The basis of our population has thus remained Gaulish. The Gauls are our ancestors."

Astérix, the popular series of French comic books following the exploits of a village of "indomitable Gauls", satirizes this view by combining scenes set in classical antiquity with modern ethnic clichés of the French and other nations.

Similarly, in Swiss national historiography of the 19th century, the Gaulish Helvetii were chosen as representing the ancestral Swiss population (compare Helvetia as national allegory), as the Helvetii had settled in both the French and the German-speaking parts of Switzerland, and their Gaulish language set them apart from Latin- and German-speaking populations in equal measure.

Genetics

A genetic study published in PLOS One in December 2018 examined 45 individuals buried at a La Téne necropolis in Urville-Nacqueville, France. The people buried there were identified as Gauls. The mtDNA of the examined individuals belonged primarily to haplotypes of H and U. They were found to be carrying a large amount of steppe ancestry (originating near what is now Ukraine and southwestern Russia), and to have been closely related to peoples of the preceding Bell Beaker culture, suggesting genetic continuity between Bronze Age and Iron Age France. Significant gene flow with Great Britain and Iberia was detected. The results of the study partially supported the belief that French people are largely descended from the Gauls.

A genetic study published in the Journal of Archaeological Science in October 2019 examined 43 maternal and 17 paternal lineages for the La Téne necropolis in Urville-Nacqueville, France, and 27 maternal and 19 paternal lineages for La Téne tumulus of Gurgy ‘Les Noisats’ near modern Paris, France. The examined individuals displayed strong genetic resemblance to peoples of the earlier Yamnaya culture, Corded Ware culture and Bell Beaker culture. They carried a diverse set of maternal lineages associated with steppe ancestry. The paternal lineages were on the other hand belonged entirely to haplogroup R and R1b, both of whom are associated with steppe ancestry. The evidence suggested that the Gauls of the La Téne culture were patrilineal and patrilocal, which is in agreement with archaeological and literary evidence.

A genetic study published in iScience in April 2022 examined 49 genomes from 27 sites in Bronze Age and Iron Age France. The study found evidence of strong genetic continuity between the two periods, particularly in southern France. The samples from northern and southern France were highly homogenous, with northern samples displaying links to contemporary samples form Great Britain and Sweden, and southern samples displaying links to Celtiberians. The northern French samples were distinguished from the southern ones by elevated levels of steppe-related ancestry. R1b was by far the most dominant paternal lineage, while H was the most common maternal lineage. The Iron Age samples resembled those of modern-day populations of France, Great Britain and Spain. The evidence suggested that the Gauls of the La Téne culture largely evolved from local Bronze Age populations.

See also
 List of Celtic tribes

Notes

Bibliography

Laing, Lloyd and Jenifer. Art of the Celts, Thames and Hudson, London 1992 

Megaw, Ruth and Vincent, Celtic Art, 2001, Thames and Hudson, 

Sandars, Nancy K., Prehistoric Art in Europe, Penguin (Pelican, now Yale, History of Art), 1968 (nb 1st edn.)

Wallace, Patrick F., O'Floinn, Raghnall eds. Treasures of the National Museum of Ireland: Irish Antiquities

Further reading

External links

 Acy-Romance, the Gauls of Ardennes 
 Lattes, Languedoc and the Southern Gauls 
 The Gauls in Provence: the Oppidum of Entremont 

 
Celtic ethnolinguistic groups
Historical Celtic peoples